Matthew McGrory (May 17, 1973 – August 9, 2005) was an American actor. At , he was recognized as the tallest actor by Guinness World Records. He portrayed physically imposing characters throughout his career, including Tiny Firefly in the horror films House of 1000 Corpses (2003) and The Devil's Rejects (2005) and Karl the Giant in the fantasy comedy-drama Big Fish (2003). McGrory also held the Guinness World Records for biggest feet and longest toe.

Early life
McGrory was born in West Chester, Pennsylvania, the son of George and Maureen McGrory. He was over 1.5 m (5 feet) tall by the time he completed kindergarten. He studied pre-law at Widener University. He also studied Criminal Justice at West Chester University.

Career
McGrory's large size led to appearances on The Howard Stern Show beginning in December 1996 as a member of Stern's Wack Pack. He appeared on  daytime talk shows hosted by Maury Povich, Jenny Jones and Oprah Winfrey   and in music videos including Iron Maiden's "The Wicker Man" and the 1999 Marilyn Manson "Coma White" (and God Is in the T.V. VHS cover).  He can also be seen in Blondie's video for their 2003 hit "Good Boys."
 
Due to his height and deep voice, he was in demand to play roles in movies cast as a giant – he did so in films such as Bubble Boy (2001), Big Fish (2003), House of 1000 Corpses (2003) and The Devil's Rejects (2005). Television appearances included Malcolm in the Middle, Charmed, and Carnivàle.

Death
On August 9, 2005, while living in Sherman Oaks, California with his girlfriend Melissa, McGrory died at age 32 of congestive heart failure.

Rob Zombie's film The Devil's Rejects was dedicated to McGrory’s memory.

Filmography

References

External links

Matthew McGrory at Allmovie
MatthewMcGrory.com

1973 births
2005 deaths
20th-century American male actors
21st-century American male actors
American male film actors
American male television actors
Male actors from Pennsylvania
People from West Chester, Pennsylvania
People with gigantism
West Chester University alumni
Widener University alumni